Dipsas ventrimaculata, Boulenger's tree snake, is a non-venomous snake found in Paraguay, Argentina, and Brazil.

References

Dipsas
Snakes of South America
Reptiles of Paraguay
Reptiles of Argentina
Reptiles of Brazil
Reptiles described in 1885
Taxa named by George Albert Boulenger